Acacia subternata is a shrub of the genus Acacia and the subgenus Plurinerves that is endemic to an area of northern Australia.

Description
It branches from close to ground level and has smooth to slightly fissured grey-brown coloured bark.

Taxonomy
The species was first formally described by the botanist Ferdinand von Mueller in 1859 as a part of the work Contributiones ad Acaciarum Australiae Cognitionem as published in the Journal of the Proceedings of the Linnean Society, Botany. It was reclassified by Leslie Pedley in 2003 then returned to genus Acacia in 2006.

Distribution
The shrub is native to the top end of the Northern Territory with the bulk of the population found from around Borroloola in the south east to the Victoria river in the south west. It is often situated on sandstone or quartzite ridges growing in skeletal sandy loam soils as a part of Eucalyptus woodland communities and is found with a spinifex understorey.

See also
List of Acacia species

References

subternata
Flora of the Northern Territory
Taxa named by Ferdinand von Mueller
Plants described in 1859